Ruth Lake Provincial Park is a provincial park in British Columbia, Canada, located northeast of 100 Mile House.

References

Geography of the Cariboo
Provincial parks of British Columbia
1959 establishments in British Columbia
Protected areas established in 1959